Pavel Nikolayevich Filonov (January 8, 1883 – December 3, 1941) was a Russian avant-garde painter, art theorist, and poet.

Biography

Filonov was born in Moscow on January 8, 1883 (Gregorian calendar) or December 27, 1882 (Julian calendar). In 1897, he moved to St. Petersburg, where he took art lessons. In 1908, he entered St. Petersburg Academy of Arts, from which, he was expelled in 1910.

In 1910–1914, he took part in the arts group Soyuz Molodyozhi created by artists Elena Guro and Mikhail Matyushin. In 1912, he wrote the article The Canon and the Law, in which, he formulated the principles of analytical realism, or "anti-Cubism". According to Filonov, Cubism represents objects using elements of their surface geometry but "analytical realists" should represent objects using elements of their inner soul. He was faithful to these principles for the remainder of his life.

During the years 1913 to 1915, Filonov was close to Vladimir Mayakovsky, Velimir Khlebnikov, and other futurists. He co-illustrated Khlebnikov's Selected Poems with Postscript, 1907–1914 alongside Kazimir Malevich during this time. In the autumn of 1916, he enlisted for service in World War I, and served on the Romanian front. Filonov participated actively in the Russian Revolution of 1917 and served as the Chairman of the Revolutionary War Committee of Dunay region.

In 1919, he exhibited in the First Free Exhibit of Artists of All Trends at the Hermitage. In 1923, he became a professor of St. Petersburg Academy of Arts and a member of the Institute for Artistic Culture (INKhUK). He organized a large arts school of Masters of Analytical Realism (over seventy artists, including an American sculptor and portrait painter Helen Hooker). Their work influenced suprematism and expressionism.

In 1929, a large retrospective exhibition of Filonov art was planned at the Russian Museum; however, the Soviet government forbade the exhibition. From 1932 onward, Filonov literally starved but still refused to sell his works to private collectors. He wanted to give all his works to the Russian Museum as a gift so as to start a Museum of Analytical Realism. He died of starvation on December 3, 1941 during the Siege of Leningrad.

Method
Under the umbrella of Universal Flowering, Filonov put forth a manner of working that proceeded from the particular to the general. He believed that objects and fields should be built up from small details and bits and stated that doing it the other-way-round was nothing short of "charlatanism". To this end, he worked, and required his students to work, with very small brushes in painting and the finest of points when drawing.

Legacy

Most of Filonov's works were saved by his sister Yevdokiya Nikolayevna Glebova. She stored the paintings in the Russian Museum's archives and eventually donated them as a gift. Exhibitions of Filonov's work were forbidden. In 1967, an exhibition of Filonov's works in Novosibirsk was permitted. In 1988, his work was allowed in the Russian Museum. In 1989 and 1990, the first international exhibition of Filonov's work was held in Paris.

During the period of half-legal status of Filonov's works it was seemingly easy to steal them; however, there was a legend that Filonov's ghost protected his art and anybody trying to steal his paintings or to smuggle them abroad would soon die, become paralyzed, or have a similar misfortune.

Selected works

See also 
 Fine Art of Leningrad

References

External links

Pavel Filonov at Olga's Gallery
 Filonov's biography
MoMa's Collection: Pavel Filonov

1883 births
1941 deaths
Analytical art
Deaths by starvation
Writers from Moscow
Russian avant-garde
Russian male poets
Soviet painters
Soviet poets
Soviet male writers
20th-century Russian male writers
Members of the Leningrad Union of Artists
Painters from Saint Petersburg
20th-century Russian painters
Russian male painters
Burials at Serafimovskoe Cemetery
Victims of the Siege of Leningrad
20th-century Russian male artists